Northern Bank building or Shimal Bank building is an edifice located on the Haji Zeynalabdin Tagiyev Street in the Sabail district of Baku. By the order of the Cabinet of Ministers of the Republic of Azerbaijan dated with 2 August 2001, the bank building was taken under the state protection as an architectural monument of history and culture of national importance (No. 165).

History 
The bank building was built in 1903-1905. It housed the Baku branch of the Banque du Nord, or Northern Bank. After the merger of Northern Bank with the Russian-Chinese Bank, the Russian-Asian Bank was formed. The Baku branch of it was also located in this building. Currently, the edifice houses the central branch of the International Bank of Azerbaijan.

Description 
The limestone stone was used in the construction of the building which plays an important role in revealing the architectural image of the bank. This monumental building was built in the Baku Art Nouveau style and was executed at a high architectural level. The portal with the tectonics of plastic morphogenesis and a relief decorative mask is especially highlighted.

Photos

See also 
 Mitrofanov Residence
 Mikado Cinematography building
 Property of Haji Mustafa Rasulov

References

Architecture in Azerbaijan
Theatres in Azerbaijan